Copiopteryx is a genus of moths in the family Saturniidae first described by James Duncan and John O. Westwood in 1841.

Species
The genus includes the following species:

 Copiopteryx adaheli Draudt, 1930
 Copiopteryx andensis Lemaire, 1974
 Copiopteryx banghaasi Draudt, 1930
 Copiopteryx biedermanni Kotzsch, 1930
 Copiopteryx cleopatra Girard, 1882
 Copiopteryx derceto (Maassen, 1872)
 Copiopteryx imperialis Girard, 1882
 Copiopteryx inversa Giacomelli, 1911
 Copiopteryx jehovah (Strecker, 1874)
 Copiopteryx montei Gagarin, 1933
 Copiopteryx phippsi Schaus, 1932
 Copiopteryx phoenix Deyrolle, 1868
 Copiopteryx semiramis (Cramer, 1775)
 Copiopteryx sonthonnaxi Em. Andre, 1905
 Copiopteryx steindachneri Fassl, 1917
 Copiopteryx travassosi May, 1933
 Copiopteryx virgo Zikan, 1929

References

Arsenurinae